The third season of the American science fiction television series The X-Files commenced airing on Fox in the United States on September 22, 1995, concluded on the same channel on May 17, 1996, and contained 24 episodes. The season continues to follow the cases of FBI special agents Fox Mulder and Dana Scully, portrayed by David Duchovny and Gillian Anderson respectively, who investigate paranormal or supernatural cases, known as X-Files by the FBI.

The season features the conclusion of several plot-lines introduced in season two, while also introducing several new plot elements. Major plot arcs include an elaborate conspiracy being discovered when an alien autopsy video is acquired by Mulder, Scully's search for the killer of her sister, and the mystery surrounding X (Steven Williams). Pivotal characters such as the First Elder (Don S. Williams) and the alien virus black oil were first introduced in this season. In addition, the season features a wide variety of "Monster-of-the-Week" episodes, stand-alone stories not of influence to the wider mythology of the series.

The season attained higher ratings than season two, the highest viewing audience the series had yet achieved. Season premiere "The Blessing Way"  debuted with a Nielsen household rating of 19.94, which more than doubled the premiere of the last season. The ratings consistently stayed above 15.0, making it one of the most watched series of the 1995–96 television line-up. The season received generally positive reviews from television critics, winning five Primetime Emmy Awards. Many of the episodes written by writer Darin Morgan received critical acclaim, including the episodes "Clyde Bruckman's Final Repose" and "Jose Chung's From Outer Space" which are often cited as some of the best of the series. Morgan left the series following this season, due to an inability to keep up with the fast-paced nature of the show.

Plot overview 

The show centers on FBI special agents Fox Mulder (David Duchovny) and Dana Scully (Gillian Anderson) who work on cases linked to the paranormal, called X-Files. Mulder is later found in the desert following the events of the second season finale and nursed back to health by Albert Hosteen (Floyd Red Crow Westerman). Meanwhile, Scully investigates the possible involvement of the smallpox eradication program in human genetic experimentation, discovering that a Nazi scientist who defected during Operation Paperclip has been conducting human experimentation to create alien-human hybrids. Her sister Melissa (Melinda McGraw), however, is shot by assassins who mistake her for Dana, and dies in hospital that night.

Investigating evidence of an alien autopsy, Mulder infiltrates a secretive government train carriage carrying an alien-human hybrid. Mulder is almost killed by a Syndicate operative guarding the hybrid, but is saved by his informant X (Steven Williams). X had been tipped off about Mulder's activities by the agent's partner Dana Scully (Gillian Anderson). Scully, meanwhile, meets a group of women with abduction experiences similar to her own, and meets another member of the Syndicate known as the First Elder (Don S. Williams), who claims during her abduction she was placed on a similar train car and experimented upon by the Japanese scientists.

The crew of a French salvage ship trying to raise a World War II-era submarine from the sea floor are stricken with massive radiation burns—except for one, who has been infected with a parasitic black oil discovered on the submarine. The oil is controlling the crewman's body, and after passing through several hosts, has overtaken Alex Krycek (Nicholas Lea), whom Mulder has been pursuing. Scully finds that the submarine had been involved in discovering the oil on the sea floor during World War II, under the guise of finding a sunken fighter plane. The infected Krycek makes his way to a missile silo used to hide a UFO, and the oil escapes his body to board the craft. Meanwhile, Scully has tracked down Luis Cardinal, the man responsible for killing her sister.

Writing 

Development of the first episode of the season, "The Blessing Way", began with the second-season finale "Anasazi". Both of those episodes, along with "Paper Clip", form a trilogy of episodes that began the third season. "Anasazi" was directed by R. W. Goodwin, who later directed the season finale "Talitha Cumi", and "Paper Clip" was directed by Rob Bowman. Bowman directed a total of eight episodes for the season, followed by Kim Manners who directed seven. Series creator Chris Carter also served as executive producer and showrunner and wrote eight episodes, directing one.

Darin Morgan had a small involvement in the second season, and was asked to contribute more content for the third. He first appeared in "The Host" as the Flukeman, and was brought on by his brother Glen Morgan to help write the episode "Blood". Morgan's first sole credit as a writer came in the episode "Humbug", which received a positive reception by the staff. David Duchovny expressed an enjoyment for working with Morgan, commenting "what I loved about his scripts was that he seemed to be trying to destroy the show." Morgan wrote a total of three episodes, but later left the series because he could not keep up with the fast-paced nature of network television. He also expressed a negative opinion of the way his teleplays were handled, despite a positive reception by both critics and the crew of his work. He also contributed to the script for the episode "Quagmire". After writing one episode the previous season, Vince Gilligan returned to write another solo episode for the season, now credited as a creative consultant. Cast member David Duchovny collaborated with Howard Gordon and Chris Carter for two episodes receiving story credit.

New writers in the third season included story editor Jeffrey Vlaming who wrote two episodes, supervising producer Charles Grant Craig who wrote a single episode, Kim Newtown who wrote two episodes, and staff writer John Shiban who wrote two episodes. All new writers except Shiban did not return after this season. Series visual effects producer Mat Beck also wrote an episode. Other producers included production manager and producer Joseph Patrick Finn and co-producer Paul Rabwin.

Themes 
"Nisei" and "731", show a darker side to the series, exploring the public's distrust in the government. Other episodes dealing with the wider mythology of the series—"Talitha Cumi", "Piper Maru" and "Apocrypha"—explore similar concepts, showcasing the shadow government plot line of the series. Episodes like "2Shy" and "Pusher" feature sadistic villains, containing human beings capable of highly immoral acts despite their seemingly mundane appearances. Another episode with a serial killer antagonist, "Grotesque", revolves around the way that evil can change and influence people. "Oubliette" offers a sentimental and emotional plot driven by the kidnapping of a young girl.  The episode features parallels to the real life Polly Klaas case and provides commentary on both stockholm syndrome and trauma.

Aliens and serial killers are not the only antagonists in the season; several episodes revolve around more traditional, B-movie inspired monsters, taking influence from horror films. These episodes include "War of the Coprophages" and "Quagmire", about killer cockroaches and a lake monster. Several episodes have satirical elements, including "D.P.O.",  "Syzygy" and "War of the Coprophages", with the latter two showcasing how the public can create panic out of need. Both "Clyde Bruckman's Final Repose" and "Jose Chung's From Outer Space" play against tropes and the established formula of the series, subverting themes the series usually followed.

Cast

Main cast

Starring 
 David Duchovny as Special Agent Fox Mulder
 Gillian Anderson as Special Agent Dana Scully

Also starring 
 Mitch Pileggi as Deputy Director Walter Skinner

Recurring cast

Guest cast

Episodes 
Episodes marked with a double dagger are episodes in the series' Alien Mythology arc.

Reception

Ratings 
The third season of The X-Files debuted with "The Blessing Way" on September 22, 1995. The episode earned a Nielsen household rating of 12.3, with a 22 share, meaning that roughly 12.3 percent of all television-equipped households, and 22 percent of households watching television, were tuned in to the episode. The episode was viewed by 19.94 million viewers. "The Blessing Way" was, at the time, the highest-rated episode of The X-Files to air; the previous record belonged to the season two entry "Fresh Bones", which only scored an 11.3 rating with a 19 share. As the season continued, however, ratings dropped slightly and stabilized. After the season premiere, the highest-rated episode of the season was the finale, "Talitha Cumi", which was viewed by 17.86 million viewers. The season hit a low with the twenty-third and penultimate episode of the season, "Wetwired", which was viewed by only 14.48 million viewers.

The series was ranked as number 55 during the 1995–96 television season, and was viewed by an average of 15.40 million viewers, an increase in almost seven percent when compared to the second season, which was viewed by 14.50. In its third season, The X-Files became Fox's top-rated program in the 18- to 49-year-old demographic. The third season of the show was the last to be aired on Friday nights; for its fourth season, the show was moved to Sunday.

Reviews 

Emily VanDerWerff of The A.V. Club called the third season The X-Files "best season and maybe one of the greatest TV seasons of all time", noting it was consistent and "[swung] from strength to strength" between mythology and stand-alone episodes. However, she thought it "starts out kind of terribly" with "The Blessing Way". Zack Handlen, VanDerWerff's colleague, wrote that the third season was "one of the show's strongest, with the conspiracy arc still keeping tension high instead of just vamping for time. By this point, the sometimes awkward effects work of the early years is gone, and the overall direction is highly polished, giving even the season's weakest entries a cinematic feel". He also stated that Morgan's "Clyde Bruckman's Final Repose" and "Jose Chung's From Outer Space" were "The X-Files two greatest hours". The writing credits provided by Morgan was widely cited as a highlight of the season. "War of the Coprophages" written by him received positive reviews, and Entertainment Weekly gave "War of the Coprophages" an A–, who praised the absurdity and entertainment value of the episode. Another episode, "Quagmire" containing some writing credits by Morgan received positive reviews, with the 10-minute dialogue sequence featuring Mulder and Scully receiving highly positive reviews.

Gilligan's episode "Pusher" was also cited as one of the best episodes of the series by both IGN and Den of Geek, and Tom Kessenich, in his book Examination: An Unauthorized Look at Seasons 6–9 of the X-Files, named the episode the third best episode of The X-Files and called it the "best MOTW ["monster-of-the-week"] in the series history" Duchovny considers his performance in "Oubliette" as his favorite of the season, an episode that also received mostly positive reviews. Writing for DVD Talk, Earl Cressey rated the season overall four-and-a-half stars out of five, finding that the series' increased budget meant that its production values and the quality of its guest appearances were better than previous seasons.

Accolades 
The third season earned the series eight Primetime Emmy Award nominations. It received its second consecutive nomination for Outstanding Drama Series, Gillian Anderson received her first nomination for Outstanding Lead Actress in a Drama Series, and the episode "Jose Chung's From Outer Space" was nominated for Outstanding Individual Achievement in Art Direction for a Series. The series won five awards, including Outstanding Individual Achievement in Writing for a Drama Series, for the episode "Clyde Bruckman's Final Repose" written by Darin Morgan; Peter Boyle won for Outstanding Guest Actor in a Drama Series for his performance in that same episode. The episode "Nisei" won for both Outstanding Individual Achievement in Sound Editing for a Series and Outstanding Individual Achievement in Sound Mixing for a Drama Series. John S. Bartley won for Outstanding Individual Achievement in Cinematography for a Series due to the episode "Grotesque". Duchovny and Anderson were each nominated for a Golden Globe Award for their performances.

DVD release

Notes

References

Bibliography

External links 

 

 
1995 American television seasons
1996 American television seasons